Keane Charles Duncan is an English Conservative politician who served as Leader of Ryedale District Council from May 2019 to February 2021.
He lives in Malton and works as a deputy news editor for the Daily Star.

Duncan became Leader at the age of 24, making him the youngest Council Leader in the country.

Political career
Duncan studied at the University of York. While there, he was made the chairman on the University of York Conservative and Unionist Association 2014–2015. He was elected in the 2015 Ryedale District Council election, aged 20. In the 2017 North Yorkshire County Council election he became the youngest member of North Yorkshire County Council.

Duncan stood for re-election in the 2019 Ryedale District Council election. He retained his ward and was appointed Leader of the Council.

During his term, Conservative councillors stated their opposition to fracking and called for a moratorium in Ryedale. He supported proposals to create new unitary authorities for York and North Yorkshire and stood down as Leader in protest at proposals to increase Council Tax.

Duncan was elected for the Norton ward in 2022 elections to a new, unitary North Yorkshire Council. He was subsequently appointed to North Yorkshire County Council's interim Executive with responsibility for highways and transportation.

References 

English politicians
English journalists
Conservative Party (UK)
Living people
People from Malton, North Yorkshire
Alumni of the University of York
Year of birth missing (living people)